Tasiusaq Bay (old spelling: Tasiussaq) is a bay in the Upernavik Archipelago in the Avannaata municipality in northwestern Greenland. It is an indentation of northeastern Baffin Bay. The name of the bay derives from the name of the settlement of the same name in the bay.

Geography 
The bay is located in the north-central part of Upernavik Archipelago, between Sugar Loaf Bay in the north, and Upernavik Icefjord in the south.

Islands 
There is a large number of islands and skerries in the bay, scattered over the entire area. They can be divides into several groups:

Northern band 
The northernmost group of islands lies between the Nasaussap Saqqaa fjord emptying into Sugar Loaf Bay in the north, and the Kangerlussuaq Icefjord in the south. The major islands, listed from north to south, are:

 Qullikorsuit Island
 Apparsuit Island
 Paornivik Island
 Mernoq Island

Central band 
The central group of islands lies between the Kangerlussuaq Icefjord in the north, and the mouth of Upernavik Icefjord in the south. The major islands, listed from north to south, are:

 Tuttorqortooq Island
 Horse Head Island
 Qallunaat Island
 Mattaangassut Island
 Nutaarmiut Island
 Saattorsuaq Island
 Nuuluk Island
 Anarusuk Island
 Aappilattoq Island
 Uigorlersuaq Island
 Tasiusaq Island
 Aukarnersuaq Island
 Paagussat Island
 Qaqaarissorsuaq Island
 Illunnguit Island
 Kangaarsuk Island
 Ateqanngitsorsuaq Island
 Qaarsorsuatsiaq Island
 Innaarsuit Island
 Naajaat Island

Upernavik Icefjord islands 

The southern group of islands bounds the Upernavik Icefjord from the north. The major islands, listed from east to west, are:

 Maniitsoq
 Puugutaa
 Qaneq
 Sisuarissut
 Tussaaq

Glaciers and nunataks 
The coastline of mainland Greenland in the region is a series of alternating nunataks and glaciers draining the Greenland ice sheet. the major features, from north to south, are:

 Giesecke Glacier with its two tongues: Qeqertarsuup Sermia and Kakiffait Sermiat
 Nunatarsuaq nunatak
 Alanngorsuup Sermia glacier
 Qassersuaq Peninsula
 Upernavik Glacier

Waterways 
The major waterways of Tasiusaq Bay are the Nasaussap Saqqaa fjord in the north, Kangerlussuaq Icefjord, and Upernavik Icefjord in the south.

Settlement 
The mainland is uninhabited, and only some of the islands are settled. Tasiusaq is the largest settlement in the bay. Other settlements are Nutaarmiut, Innaarsuit, and Naajaat. The former settlement of Tussaaq has one inhabitant left.

References 

 
Bays of the Upernavik Archipelago